This is a list of transfers in Serbian football for the 2019–20 summer transfer window.
 Moves featuring Serbian SuperLiga and Serbian First League sides are listed.
 The order by which the clubs are listed is equal to the classifications at the end of the 2018–19 season.

Serbian SuperLiga

Red Star Belgrade

In:

 
 
 

Out:

Radnički Niš

In:

 

Out:

Partizan

In:

Out:

Čukarički

In:

Out:

Mladost Lučani

In:

Out:

Napredak Kruševac

In:

Out:

Vojvodina

In:

Out:

Proleter Novi Sad

In:

Out:

Radnik Surdulica

In:

Out:

Spartak Subotica

In:

Out:

Voždovac

In:

Out:

Mačva Šabac

In:

Out:

Rad

In:

Out:

TSC Bačka Topola

In:

Out:

Javor Ivanjica

In:

Out:

Inđija

In:

Out:

Serbian First League

Dinamo Vranje

In:

Out:

Zemun

In:

Out:

Bačka BP

In:

Out:

Radnički 1923

In:

Out:

Metalac G. M.

In:

Out:

Zlatibor Čajetina

In:

Out:

Sinđelić Beograd

In:

Out:

Trajal

In:

 
 
 

Out:

Budućnost Dobanovci

In:

Out:

OFK Žarkovo

In:

Out:

Kabel

In:

Out:

Novi Pazar

In:

Out:

Grafičar Beograd

In:

Out:

Radnički Pirot

In:

Out:

Smederevo 1924

In:

Out:

Kolubara

In:

Out:

See also
Serbian SuperLiga
Serbian First League

References

Serbian SuperLiga
2019
transfers